Siniša Saničanin (born 24 April 1995) is a Bosnian professional footballer who plays as a centre-back for Serbian SuperLiga club Partizan and the Bosnia and Herzegovina national team.

Saničanin started his professional career at Rudar Prijedor, before joining Borac Banja Luka in 2015. The following year, he moved to Mladost Lučani. A year later, Saničanin signed with Vojvodina. He switched to Partizan in 2021.

A former youth international for Bosnia and Herzegovina, Saničanin made his senior international debut in 2020, earning 19 caps since.

Club career

Early career
Saničanin came through youth setup of his hometown club Rudar Prijedor. He made his professional debut against Olimpic on 14 September 2013 at the age of 18. On 8 November 2014, he scored his first professional goal in a triumph over Proleter Teslić.

In the summer of 2015, Saničanin joined Borac Banja Luka.

In January 2016, he signed with Serbian side Mladost Lučani.

In August 2017, he switched to Vojvodina.

Partizan
In June 2021, Saničanin moved to Partizan on a three-year deal. He made his official debut for the team on 17 July against Proleter Novi Sad. On 26 August, he scored his first goal for Partizan in UEFA Europa Conference League play-offs against Santa Clara. Fourteen months later, he scored his first league goal in a defeat of TSC Bačka Topola.

International career
Saničanin represented Bosnia and Herzegovina at various youth levels.

In March 2020, he received his first senior call-up, for UEFA Euro 2020 qualifying play-offs against Northern Ireland, but had to wait until 4 September to make his debut in a 2020–21 UEFA Nations League game against Italy.

Personal life
Saničanin married his long-time girlfriend Teodora in January 2021.

Career statistics

Club

International

Honours
Rudar Prijedor
First League of RS: 2014–15

Vojvodina
Serbian Cup: 2019–20

References

External links

1995 births
Living people
People from Prijedor
Serbs of Bosnia and Herzegovina
Bosnia and Herzegovina footballers
Bosnia and Herzegovina youth international footballers
Bosnia and Herzegovina under-21 international footballers
Bosnia and Herzegovina international footballers
Bosnia and Herzegovina expatriate footballers
Association football central defenders
FK Rudar Prijedor players
FK Borac Banja Luka players
FK Mladost Lučani players
FK Vojvodina players
FK Partizan players
Premier League of Bosnia and Herzegovina players
First League of the Republika Srpska players
Serbian SuperLiga players
Expatriate footballers in Serbia
Bosnia and Herzegovina expatriate sportspeople in Serbia